Grovehill Junction is a junction in Beverley, East Riding of Yorkshire. At one time, the junction was a roundabout. It is now a single level junction with 42 traffic lights and is considered to be the UK's craziest junction.

History
The earliest recorded history of the junction is that it was a 5 way roundabout.

The roundabout was replaced with a junction having nine crossing points and 20 movements, controlled by 42 traffic lights  in February 2015.

Early in October 2015, the lights failed and the traffic was observed to move more freely than with the traffic lights working.

An audit of the junction has stated the junction has more lights than needed.

Reception
The junction has been dubbed "The Red Light District".

A German TV station sent a crew to drive around the junction for the amusement of its viewers. Despite the concerns, East Riding of Yorkshire Council states the junction "works well".

References

Road junctions in England
Beverley